Sardinia Kidnapped ("Kidnapped"), also known as Ransom in Sardinia, Island of Crime and Unlawful Restraint, is a 1968 Italian poliziotteschi film directed by Gianfranco Mingozzi and starring Franco Nero, Charlotte Rampling and Frank Wolff.

Plot
University student Francesco is kidnapped by bandits in Sardinia. His English tourist friend, Christina, a powerless witness to the kidnapping, rushes off to warn the family. Gavino, a childhood friend of Francesco's, advises Christina against talking to the police, but she does and the police begin searching for the kidnappers. In a firefight between gangsters and police, Francesco is killed, but the bandits hide his body. Meanwhile, Francesco's father offers to sell his lands to Osilio, a wealthy landowner, to get the money needed to pay the ransom for his son. Later, Gavino lets himself be seized by the bandits, and he convinces them that their leader is betraying and exploiting them. The bandits deliver their leader to Gavino, who recognizes him as Osilio. For Osilio there is no way out: the two men, together with Gavino, make their own justice.

Cast
 Franco Nero as Gavino
 Charlotte Rampling as Christina Fisher
 Frank Wolff as Osilio
 Ennio Balbo as Mr. Marras
 Pierluigi Aprà as Francesco Marras
 Steffen Zacharias as Santulus Surgiu
 Margarita Lozano as Mrs. Marras
 Enzo Robutti

References

External links

1968 films
1968 crime films
1960s Italian-language films
English-language Italian films
1960s English-language films
Films directed by Gianfranco Mingozzi
Poliziotteschi films
Films set in Sardinia
1960s Italian films